The pulvinar nuclei or nuclei of the pulvinar (nuclei pulvinares) are the nuclei (cell bodies of neurons) located in the thalamus (a part of the vertebrate brain). As a group they make up the collection called the pulvinar of the thalamus (pulvinar thalami), usually just called the pulvinar.

The pulvinar is usually grouped as one of the lateral thalamic nuclei in rodents and carnivores, and stands as an independent complex in primates.

Structure
By convention, the pulvinar is divided into four nuclei:

Their connectomic details are as follows:

 The lateral and inferior pulvinar nuclei have widespread connections with early visual cortical areas.
 The dorsal part of the lateral pulvinar nucleus predominantly has connections with posterior parietal cortex and the dorsal stream cortical areas.
 The medial pulvinar nucleus has widespread connections with cingulate, posterior parietal, premotor and prefrontal cortical areas.
 The pulvinar also has input from the superior colliculus to inferior, lateral and medial sections, which seems to be important in the initiation and compensation of saccade, as well as the regulation of visual attention

Clinical significance
Lesions of the pulvinar can result in neglect syndromes and attentional deficits. In addition, lesions in early life can impact normal visuomotor behaviors such as reaching and grasping. Furthermore, the pulvinar was demonstrated to be instrumental in the preservation of vision afforded to a boy who lost his primary visual cortex bilaterally at birth as well as other forms of blindsight in monkeys and humans. Strokes affecting the pulvinar have also been implicated in the development of chronic pain.  In a case study of photophobia caused by blue light, pulvinar nuclei associated with the melanopsin containing ipRGCs visual pathway where bilaterally activated.

Other animals
The pulvinar varies in importance in different animals: it is virtually nonexistent in the rat, and grouped as the lateral posterior-pulvinar complex with the lateral posterior thalamic nucleus due to its small size in cats. In humans it makes up roughly 40% of the thalamus making it the largest of its nuclei.  Significant research has been undertaken in the marmoset examining the role of the retinorecipient region of the inferior pulvinar (medial subdivision), which projects to visual cortical area MT, in the early development of MT and the dorsal stream, as well as following early-life lesions of the primary visual cortex (V1).

Etymology and pronunciation
The word pulvinar comes to scientific English vocabulary via New Latin from classical Latin pulvinus 'cushion'. In the religion of ancient Rome, a pulvinar was an empty throne, a cushioned couch for occupation by a deity. Like the cervix uteri is usually just called the cervix (with "which cervix" being implicit), the pulvinar thalami (pulvinar of the thalamus) is usually just called the pulvinar; no other anatomic structure in today's Terminologia Anatomica is called a pulvinar, although in older terminology a part of the glomus body was called the pulvinar tunicae internae segmenti arterialis anastomosis arteriovenae glomeriformis. Each pulvinar nucleus (nucleus pulvinaris) has its own set of cortical connections.

References

Additional images

External links
 
  - "The Visual Pathway from Below"